Ahmadabad (also Romanized as Aḩmadābād) is a village in Bajestan Rural District, in the Central District of Bajestan County, Razavi Khorasan Province, Iran. At the 2006 census, its population was 55, in 17 families.

See also 

 List of cities, towns and villages in Razavi Khorasan Province

References 

Populated places in Bajestan County